The 1987–88 season was Blackpool F.C.'s 80th season (77th consecutive) in the Football League. They competed in the 24-team Division Three, then the third tier of English league football, finishing tenth.

Mark Taylor was the club's top scorer, with 23 goals (21 in the league and two in the FA Cup).

The following players partook in the squad photo before the season's commencement: John Deary, Andy McAteer, Colin Methven, Richard Powell, Tony Cunningham, Barry Siddall, Paul Jones, Neil Matthews, Mark Bradshaw, Mike Davies, Mark Taylor, Craig Madden, Steve Morgan, Mike Walsh, Keith Walwyn, Brian Butler, Carl Lancashire and Alan Mayes.

Table

Results

Third Division

FA Cup

League Cup

Associate Members' Cup

References

General

Specific

External links
"Denis in a real fury as Roker lose top spot"  – Sunderland Echo

Blackpool
Blackpool F.C. seasons